The 2020 FC Taraz season was the club's second season back in the Kazakhstan Premier League following their relegation at the end of the 2017 season, and 29th season in total.

Season events
On 13 March, the Football Federation of Kazakhstan announced all league fixtures would be played behind closed doors for the foreseeable future due to the COVID-19 pandemic. On 16 March the Football Federation of Kazakhstan suspended all football until 15 April.

On 26 July, it was announced that the league would resume on 1 July, with no fans being permitted to watch the games. The league was suspended for a second time on 3 July, for an initial two weeks, due to an increase in COVID-19 cases in the country.

Squad

Transfers

In

Released

Friendlies

Competitions

Premier League

Results summary

Results by round

Results

League table

Kazakhstan Cup

Squad statistics

Appearances and goals

|-
|colspan="14"|Players away from Taraz on loan:
|-
|colspan="14"|Players who left Taraz during the season:

|}

Goal scorers

Clean sheet

Disciplinary record

Notes

References

External links

FC Taraz seasons
Taraz